Staten Island Community Board 3 is a local government unit of the city of New York, encompassing the Staten Island neighborhoods of Annadale, Arden Heights, Bay Terrace, Charleston, Eltingville, Great Kills, Greenridge, Huguenot, Pleasant Plains, Prince's Bay, Richmond Valley, Rossville, Tottenville and Woodrow.

Its current chairman is Frank Morano, and its district manager Charlene Wagner.

See also 
 South Shore, Staten Island

References

External links 
http://www.nyc.gov/sicb3

Community boards of Staten Island